Clevan "Tank" Williams (born June 30, 1980) is a former American football  safety. He played college football at Stanford and was drafted by the Tennessee Titans in the second round of the 2002 NFL Draft. He also played for the Minnesota Vikings and New England Patriots. Williams is currently a fantasy football analyst at Yahoo! Sports and a real-estate agent in the San Francisco area.

Early years
Williams attended Bay High School in Bay St. Louis, Mississippi where he played football as a safety as well as a quarterback.  He also played basketball and ran track all four years in high school. During high school, he was also employed by the Winn-Dixie grocery store in Bay St. Louis where he worked as a bag boy.

According to Williams, his nickname came from his sister: as an infant, he drank so much milk that his sister suggested to his mother that his mother should give him a tank of milk instead of a bottle.

College career
Williams attended Stanford University, where he played in 10 games as a true freshman in 1998. He started six games at free safety in 1999, and earned second-team All-Pacific-10 Conference honors as a junior. In his senior season, Williams was a first-team All-Pac-10 pick, becoming the first defensive back in school history to win national first-team honors.

Professional career

Tennessee Titans
Drafted by the Titans in the second round (45th overall) in the 2002 NFL Draft, Williams started every game as a rookie for the Titans in 2002. He started every game in 2003 as well, posting 81 tackles, fourth on the Titans' defense that was best in the NFL against the run. His 2004 season was cut short by a knee injury that landed him on injured reserve on November 29. He returned in 2005 to start every game for the Titans, recording a career-high 83 tackles.

Minnesota Vikings
Williams signed with the Minnesota Vikings as a free agent in March 2006. On August 6, 2006, Williams was placed on the injured reserve for the 2006 season after shattering his kneecap. The Vikings re-signed Williams to a one-year deal after the season. He started only two games in 2007, recording 18 tackles on the year.

New England Patriots
Williams signed a one-year contract with the New England Patriots on March 5, 2008. Williams sustained a severe injury to his knee in training camp which caused him to be put on injured reserve, ending his season. Williams was re-signed by the Patriots on March 16, 2009. He was released on August 25 when the team signed third-round pick Tyrone McKenzie.

NFL statistics

References

External links
Official Website
New England Patriots bio
Stanford Cardinal bio

1980 births
Living people
Sportspeople from Gulfport, Mississippi
Players of American football from Mississippi
American football safeties
American football linebackers
Stanford Cardinal football players
Tennessee Titans players
Minnesota Vikings players
New England Patriots players
Ed Block Courage Award recipients